Ein Kerem is a neighborhood in Jerusalem.

Ein Kerem may also refer to:

Ein Kerem Street in Jerusalem
Ein Kerem Agricultural School